The Women's 48 kilograms event at the 2018 Asian Games took place on 20 August 2018 at the Jakarta International Expo Hall A.

Schedule
All times are Western Indonesia Time (UTC+07:00)

Records 

 Nurcan Taylan's world record was rescinded in 2021.

Results
Legend
NM — No mark

References

External links
Weightlifting at the 2018 Asian Games
Official Result Book Weightlifting at awfederation.com

Women's 48 kg
2018 in women's weightlifting